Alessandra Marenzi (born 29 October 1981) is an Italian sailor. She competed in the Yngling event at the 2004 Summer Olympics.

References

External links
 

1981 births
Living people
Italian female sailors (sport)
Olympic sailors of Italy
Sailors at the 2004 Summer Olympics – Yngling
Sportspeople from Bergamo